Udachne is an urban-type settlement in the Pokrovsk Raion, Donetsk Oblast (province) of eastern Ukraine. The population is

Demographics
Native language as of the Ukrainian Census of 2001:
 Ukrainian 87.65%
 Russian 12.00%
 Belarusian 0.29%
 Moldovan (Romanian) 0.06%

References

Urban-type settlements in Pokrovsk Raion